Sir Frederick Nathaniel Ballantyne, GCMG (5 July 1936 – 23 January 2020) was the Governor-General of Saint Vincent and the Grenadines from 2002–2019. A trained cardiologist and former chief medical officer of the country, he was appointed governor-general on 22 June 2002. He succeeded Dame Monica Dacon, who had been acting in the position after the death of Charles Antrobus.

Early life and medical career
Ballantyne was born on 5 July 1936, an only child. His father owned a small hotel, and he has described himself as "from a business family". Ballantyne was the first member of his family to attend high school. On the advice of an acquaintance who had studied medicine in the United States, he chose to attend university in that country (rather than in Britain or Canada, as was usual for Vincentians at the time). He completed an initial degree in chemistry at Howard University (in Washington, D.C.), and then went on to the SUNY Upstate Medical University (in Syracuse, New York) to study medicine. The "sole black individual" enrolled in the medical school, Ballantyne was elected to student government in every year of his degree, and in his final year was elected student body president. He interned in at the Montreal General Hospital after graduation, and then completed his residency in internal medicine in Rochester, New York, followed by a fellowship in cardiology.

Upon returning to Saint Vincent in 1971, Ballantyne was "the most highly trained physician on the island". He was consequently appointed chief of medicine at the newly constructed Kingstown General Hospital (now called the Milton Cato Memorial Hospital). Ballantyne oversaw upgrades in the facilities of both the hospital and regional health clinics, with one of his first priorities being to expand the hospital's immunisation program. He also instituted the hospital's Visiting Specialist Program, which recruited overseas medical specialists to volunteer in Saint Vincent's hospitals in exchange for free accommodation in the country's resorts. In 1985, Ballantyne was appointed Saint Vincent's chief medical officer, serving in the position until 1992. He remained involved in medicine after his official retirement from practising, in a consulting role. 

Outside of his career in the medical field, Ballantyne had business interests in several other areas. Prior to being appointed governor-general, he served as president of the Millennium Bank, an offshore bank registered in Saint Vincent, and also as president of Dimethaid International Inc., a pharmaceutical company registered in Barbados. He was also the founder of International Business Services Limited (IBS), a financial services provider now run by his son, Marcus, and a co-owner of the Young Island Resort, a tourist resort on a small island off Saint Vincent's southern coast.

Governor-General
Ballantyne was sworn in as Governor-General of Saint Vincent and the Grenadines on 22 June 2002, having been nominated to the position by the country's prime minister, Ralph Gonsalves. He replaced Dame Monica Dacon, who had been acting governor-general since the death of Sir Charles Antrobus in 3 June 2002. Later in the year 2002, in connection with his new appointment, he was created a Knight Grand Cross of the Order of Saint Michael and Saint George by Queen Elizabeth II. In June 2009, Ballantyne was also awarded a Doctor of Science (D.Sc.) degree by the University of the West Indies (UWI), as one of sixteen regional figures being recognised for their contributions with honorary degrees.

References

External links
 The Governor General: Official Website of the Government of St. Vincent & the Grenadines

1936 births
2020 deaths
Governors-General of Saint Vincent and the Grenadines
Knights Grand Cross of the Order of St Michael and St George
Saint Vincent and the Grenadines expatriates in the United States
Saint Vincent and the Grenadines cardiologists
Howard University alumni
State University of New York Upstate Medical University alumni
People from Saint Andrew Parish, Saint Vincent and the Grenadines
Saint Vincent and the Grenadines healthcare managers
Afro-Vincentians